Carl Jacob Karsten Petersén (18 April 1883 – 14 April 1963) was a Swedish Army officer. During World War II he served as head of the intelligence agency C-byrån. He later served as Secretary General of the International Road Transport Union.

Early life
Petersén was born on 18 April 1883 in Stockholm, Sweden, the son of deputy assistant Carl Petersén and Ingeborg Tanberg.

Career
He became a second lieutenant in the Uppland Artillery Regiment (A 5) in 1903 and was promoted to lieutenant in 1906. He attended the Royal Central Gymnastics Institute in 1907. Petersén was major and instructor in the Persian Gendarmerie from 1911 to 1913 and participated in the Gallipoli Campaign in 1915. The same year he was promoted to captain in the Swedish Army and did the certificate exams for balloon license. Petersén participated in the Finnish Civil War in 1918 as a lieutenant colonel in the White Guard.

He was then attaché in Warsaw from 1919 to 1920, was in the Commission Concerning the Exchange of Greek and Turkish Populations from 1923 to 1925, the Bulgarian Refugee Commission from 1926 to 1928, in Syria in 1929 and the League of Nations border control commission in Syria and Iran in 1932. In 1932, Petersén was promoted to major in the Swedish Army. He was Head of Department at the International Red Cross in Paris from 1921 to 1937, the general secretary of the Royal Swedish Aero Club from 1937 to 1939 and was legation counsellor in Berlin and worked at the B Department of the Ministry for Foreign Affairs from 1939 to 1940. Petersén was head of the intelligence agency C-byrån from 1940 to 1946. In 1944, he led the Swedish side of the Operation Stella Polaris.

During the war, Petersén and his colleague Algot Törneman had organised private arms trades. They had sold weapons via a private firm, Skandiastål, to the Norwegian and Danish resistance movements. After the war Petersén moved to Switzerland where he continued to represent the weapons firm Skandiastål. He became a major in the reserve of Bergslagen Artillery Regiment in 1945 and a lieutenant colonel in 1947. Petersén later served as secretary general of the International Road Transport Union in Geneva.

Personal life
Petersén got engaged to Esther Warodell (1886–1978) on 23 August 1909 and they married on 22 February 1910. Esther was the daughter of Oscar Andrén (1858–1918) and his wife Ellen Andersson (1863–1952). Esther was adopted by her stepfather Carl Warodell (1847–1902), a captain of the Göte Life Guards.

One daughter was born in Tehran, Iran on 19 October 1912. They also had on son, ambassador  (1914–1976). He had a total of four children: Carl Henrik, Ingeborg, Rurik and Kerstin.

Death

Petersén died on 14 April 1963 in Geneva, Switzerland. He was interred on 27 June 1963 at Norra begravningsplatsen i Stockholm.

Dates of rank

Sweden
1903 – Underlöjtnant
1906 – Lieutenant
1916 – Captain
1932 – Major
1947 – Lieutenant colonel

Finland
1918 – Lieutenant colonel

Awards and decorations

Swedish
  Knight of the Order of the Sword (1925)
  Knight of the Order of the Polar Star (1937)
 Swedish Red Cross' Silver Medal

Foreign

Orders
  Commander of the Order of Saint Alexander with swords
  Commander of the Order of the White Rose of Finland
  Commander of the Order of the Three Stars
  Commander of the Order of the Dannebrog
  Commander of the Order of the British Empire
  Officer of the Legion of Honour
  2nd Class of the Order of the Lion and the Sun
  2nd of the Order of the Cross of Liberty with swords
  3rd Class of the Order of the Cross of Liberty with swords
  Knight 2nd Class of the Order of Polonia Restituta
  Officer of the de l'Instruction publique
  Knight 4th Class of the Order of the Cross of the Eagle

Medals and crosses
  Liakat Medal
  King Haakon VII Freedom Cross
 Military Cross
 Finnish War Memorial Medal
 Tampere Medal
 Iranian Gold Medal
 French Red Cross' Silver Medal
 Italian Red Cross' Silver Medal
 Polish Red Cross' Medal
 Netherlands Red Cross' Cross of Merit
 Norwegian Red Cross Badge of Honour
 2nd Class of the German Red Cross Badge of Honour

References

1883 births
1963 deaths
Swedish Army colonels
Swedish expatriates in Iran
Military personnel from Stockholm
People of the Finnish Civil War (White side)
Knights of the Order of the Polar Star
Knights of the Order of the Sword
Commanders of the Order of the Dannebrog
Commanders of the Order of the British Empire
Officiers of the Légion d'honneur
Recipients of the Order of the Cross of Liberty, 2nd Class
Recipients of the Order of the Cross of Liberty, 3rd Class
Knights of the Order of Polonia Restituta
Recipients of the Liakat Medal
Recipients of the King Haakon VII Freedom Cross
Burials at Norra begravningsplatsen
People of the C-byrån
Iranian Gendarmerie personnel
Swedish expatriates in Finland